James Patrick Arguelles is a California state court judge who is a former nominee to be a United States district judge of the United States District Court for the Eastern District of California.

Education 

Arguelles earned his Bachelor of Science, as a Distinguished Graduate, from the United States Naval Academy, his Master of Strategic Studies, as a Distinguished Graduate, from the United States Army War College, and his Juris Doctor, magna cum laude, from Harvard Law School in 1996.

Legal career 

Upon graduation from law school, Arguelles served as a law clerk to Judge Marilyn L. Huff of the United States District Court for the Southern District of California. He was a Partner at Stevens, O'Connell & Jacobs, LLP, an Assistant United States Attorney for the Eastern District of California, and in private practice at Gibson, Dunn & Crutcher.

Judicial service 

Since 2010, he has been a judge of the Sacramento County Superior Court. He is also a military judge in the United States Army Reserve.

Expired nomination to district court 

On June 8, 2020, President Trump announced his intent to nominate Arguelles to serve as a United States district judge for the United States District Court for the Eastern District of California. On June 18, 2020, his nomination was sent to the Senate. President Trump nominated Arguelles to the seat vacated by Judge Lawrence Joseph O'Neill, who assumed senior status on February 2, 2020. On January 3, 2021, his nomination was returned to the President under Rule XXXI, Paragraph 6 of the United States Senate.

References

External links 

Living people
Year of birth missing (living people)
Place of birth missing (living people)
20th-century American lawyers
21st-century American judges
Assistant United States Attorneys
California lawyers
California state court judges
Harvard Law School alumni
People associated with Gibson Dunn
Superior court judges in the United States
United States Army War College alumni
United States Naval Academy alumni